The Schleifer dialect is a transitional dialect of the Upper and Lower Sorbian languages spoken in the Schleife region. These two dialects are assigned to Lower Sorbian rather than Upper Sorbian by Slavists.

The Schleifer dialect is mainly passed on orally and has no modern written language of its own. Therefore, documents in the Schleifer dialect do not correspond to any standardized grammar or are mixed with one of the two standard languages.

The Sorbian half-farmer  from Rohne, who was the first non-clerical writer to write in Sorbian, wrote his texts exclusively in the Schleifer dialect. One of the largest collections of historical inscriptions in the Schleifer dialect can also be found on the historical gravestones of the cemetery in Rohne.

The association Kólesko, founded in 2011, is concerned with the documentation, publication and maintenance of the Schleifer dialect, the songs and the Schleifer costume.

References

Endangered Slavic languages
Languages of Germany
Sorbian culture
Sorbian languages
West Slavic languages